Ramasingavaram is a village in Eluru district of the Indian state of Andhra Pradesh. It is located in Pedavegi mandal of Eluru revenue division.

Demographics 

 Census of India, Ramasingavaram had a population of 8,308. The total population constitutes 4,228 males and 4,080 females, a sex ratio of 95 females per 100 males. 998 children are in the age group of 0–6 years, with a child sex ratio of 1,024 girls per 1,000 boys. The average literacy rate stands at 63.91% with 5,310 literate people.

References

Villages in Eluru district